The Waiteti Viaduct (Bridge 179),  south of Te Kuiti and  north of the station site, was opened in 1889. It is the most northerly of the major viaducts on the NIMT.

Te Araroa walk track runs through the Mangaokewa valley, near the viaduct. The nearby  Mangaokewa Scenic Reserve is mainly podocarp/tawa forest with nikau groves.

The  for the Waiteti section of the railway was acquired under the Public Works Act in 1888, apparently without payment.

Design and construction 

Designed by the Public Works Department, Waiteti Viaduct was built by Christchurch firm, J. & A. Anderson & Co, from 1887 to 1889. As the NIMT was extended south, the same firm later built the Makatote, Mangaturuturu, and Manganui-o-te-ao viaducts.

Waiteti Viaduct was completed in 1888, tested for loading in March and opened in May 1889. The wrought iron parts were made in a foundry set up by Anderson in Te Kuiti, then riveted on site. The track and footway were on a rolled iron transom.

It was given Category 1 listing by the New Zealand Historic Places Trust in 1990.

Maintenance and upgrades 

By 1913 trains and locomotives had increased in weight and the viaducts restricted use of Class X locos. So a strengthening scheme proposed to halve each span by adding supports. A concrete pier was to be added at each end, with steel rocking piers supporting the central spans. The concrete piers were then completed, but rather than the rocking piers, the central spans were strengthened with iron from either end and the end spans replaced with  plate girders. They arrived in parts at Te Kuiti, where an Ingersoll-Rand air plant machine was used to rivet the 19.5 ton girders. A detailed account of the work was given in the Railways Magazine in 1927.

Further strengthening and maintenance was done between 1950 and 1959, 1970 and 1979 in 1983, when the viaduct was painted with red lead primer and in 2017–2018, which included walkway repairs, strengthening of kingposts, replacement of corbels and water blasting.

References

External links 
 Sir George Grey Special Collections, Auckland Libraries – 1889, c.1890, 1898, 1902, 1902 track, 1954 passenger train, 1954 mixed train
 New Zealand Railways Magazine 1927

Te Kūiti
Rail transport in Waikato
Railway bridges in New Zealand
Heritage New Zealand Category 1 historic places in Waikato
Bridges in Waikato
Viaducts in New Zealand